The 1969 Italian Grand Prix was a Formula One motor race held at the Autodromo Nazionale di Monza on September 7, 1969. It was race 8 of 11 in both the 1969 World Championship of Drivers and the 1969 International Cup for Formula One Manufacturers. The race was notable in that less than a fifth of second separated the winner from the fourth-placed driver, and is one of the closest 1–2–3–4 finishes in Formula One history. Jackie Stewart and Matra-Ford claimed the Drivers' and Manufacturers' titles respectively, with three races still remaining.

Classification

Qualifying

Race

Championship standings after the race

Drivers' Championship standings

Constructors' Championship standings

Note: Only the top five positions are included for both sets of standings. Only the best 5 results from the first 6 rounds and the best 4 results from the last 5 rounds counted towards the Championship. Numbers without parentheses are Championship points; numbers in parentheses are total points scored.

References

Further reading

External links
 

Italian Grand Prix
Italian Grand Prix
Italian Grand Prix
Italian Grand Prix